Robert Carlyle  (born 14 April 1961) is a Scottish actor. His film work includes Trainspotting (1996), The Full Monty (1997), The World Is Not Enough (1999), Angela's Ashes (1999), The Beach (2000), 28 Weeks Later (2007), and Yesterday (2019). He has been in the television shows Hamish Macbeth, Stargate Universe, and Once Upon a Time. He won the BAFTA Award for Best Actor in a Leading Role for The Full Monty and a Gemini Award for Stargate Universe, and was nominated for an Emmy Award for his work in Human Trafficking (2005).

Early life
Carlyle was born on 14 April 1961 in Maryhill, Glasgow, the son of Elizabeth, a bus company employee, and Joseph Carlyle, a painter and decorator. He was raised by his father after his mother left when Carlyle was four years old. He left school at the age of 16 without any qualifications and worked for his father as a painter and decorator. He later attended night classes at Cardonald College in Glasgow.

Career
Carlyle became involved in drama at the Glasgow Arts Centre at the age of 21 (having been inspired by reading Arthur Miller's The Crucible), and subsequently graduated from the Royal Scottish Academy of Music and Drama (RSAMD). In 1991, he and four friends founded a theatre company, Raindog (which was involved in television and film work). The same year he guest starred in The Bill and also starred in his first movie, Riff-Raff, directed by Ken Loach.

In 1994, he played the gay lover of Father Greg in the film Priest. Carlyle's first high-profile role came as murderer Albert "Albie" Kinsella in an October 1994 episode of Cracker opposite Robbie Coltrane and Christopher Eccleston (notoriously killing off Eccleston's character, DCI David Bilborough). This highly acclaimed role showcased Carlyle's "pure intensity". Shortly after his appearance in Cracker, he landed the role of Highland policeman Hamish Macbeth in the BBC comedy-drama Hamish Macbeth. The series ran for three seasons from 1995 to 1997.

In 1996 and 1997, he appeared in the two highest-profile roles of his career to date: as the psychopathic Francis Begbie in Trainspotting and Gaz, the leader of a group of amateur male strippers, in The Full Monty. The latter earned Carlyle a BAFTA Award for Best Actor in a Leading Role. He also starred with Ray Winstone in the 1997 film Face. Carlyle played the senior Malachy McCourt (father of author Frank McCourt) in the 1999 film adaptation of McCourt's first memoir, Angela's Ashes; the arch villain Renard in the 1999 James Bond film The World Is Not Enough; and a cannibalistic soldier in the 1999 Ravenous.

Carlyle appeared in the 2002 Oasis music video for "Little By Little". He played Adolf Hitler in the 2003 miniseries Hitler: The Rise of Evil. In 2006 he played the villain Durza in Eragon. In 2007 Carlyle played one of the main characters in the film 28 Weeks Later. He also played the lead role as a marine engineer attempting to save London from total devastation in the disaster film Flood. That year he also portrayed Father Joseph Macavoy in the film The Tournament.

In 2008 Carlyle narrated a BBC audiobook version of The Cutting Room. In 2008, he was cast as Dr. Nicholas Rush in the television series Stargate Universe. His role in the series has been described thus: "As [the team fights] to survive, Dr. Rush (Carlyle) works to unlock the mysteries of the ship and return the group home, but evidence of his ulterior motives soon arises." His was touted by the studio as the "leading role" in Universe.

In December 2008, Carlyle appeared in 24: Redemption, a television movie based on the popular TV series 24, starring alongside Kiefer Sutherland.

In 2009, Carlyle appeared in "The Man Who Walked Around The World," a long-form commercial for Johnnie Walker whisky. Carlyle was shown walking down a path and talking for six minutes in a single long take. The ad took two days to film. The director, Jamie Rafn, afterwards referred to Carlyle as an "utter genius".

He voices the character of Gabriel Belmont, and his counterpart, Dracula in the video game Castlevania: Lords of Shadow, as well as its sequels Mirror of Fate and Lords of Shadow 2.

From 2011 to 2018, Carlyle portrayed Rumplestiltskin / Mr. Gold in the fantasy-drama television series Once Upon a Time. The character is a wizard, deal-maker, and master manipulator. In an interview, Carlyle explained that his son inspired him to create Rumplestiltskin's voice.

In 2019, he portrayed Ogilvy in a three-part television adaption of The War of the Worlds for the BBC, and made an uncredited appearance as John Lennon in the film Yesterday. 
In 2020, he portrayed Robert Sutherland, the Prime Minister and Leader of the Conservative Party in Cobra.

Acting style
Known for his commitment to authenticity in roles, Carlyle has often altered his lifestyle and physical appearance to gain a better understanding of a character; much akin to method acting. Before playing a homeless character in Antonia Bird's Safe, for example, he went to live in the Waterloo area of London where the film was set. For his role as a bus driver in Ken Loach's Carla's Song, he passed the test for a PSV licence (a licence to drive a bus with passengers) in a Glasgow Leyland Atlantean bus. Carlyle also had dentistry as part of his preparations for reprising his role as Begbie in T2 Trainspotting, choosing to have a dental implant and an adjacent tooth that became damaged during the implant's removal, extracted. Writing of Carlyle's performance in The Full Monty, Andrew Johnston stated: "Carlyle was brilliant as the savage psycho Begbie in Trainspotting; here, he proves he can be almost as good when kept on a short leash. We don't know much about Gaz, but he's the most interesting character in the movie, largely because of Carlyle's down-to-earth warmth."

Personal life
Carlyle has been married to make-up artist Anastasia Shirley since 1997. They have three children: a daughter born in 2002, and two sons born in 2004 and 2006, respectively. Carlyle is a patron of School for Life in Romania. 
Carlyle supports Rangers F.C.. He was appointed an OBE in 1999.

Filmography

Film

Television

Video games

Audio books

Awards and nominations

References

External links

1961 births
Living people
Outstanding Performance by a Cast in a Motion Picture Screen Actors Guild Award winners
Male actors from Glasgow
Alumni of the Royal Conservatoire of Scotland
Scottish male film actors
Scottish male television actors
Scottish male video game actors
Scottish male voice actors
Best Actor BAFTA Award winners
Officers of the Order of the British Empire
Best Actor in a Drama Series Canadian Screen Award winners
20th-century Scottish male actors
21st-century Scottish male actors
People from Maryhill